The molecular formula C19H21NO (molar mass: 279.38 g/mol, exact mass: 279.1623 u) may refer to:

 Cidoxepin
 Doxepin